Eddie J. Gregory (born October 28, 1931- August 31, 2022 age 90) was an American former basketball scout, coach, and executive. In the 1960s he was the head men's basketball coach at Fresno State University; he also coached at the University of Nevada, Las Vegas (UNLV). He served as interim head coach of the Golden State Warriors for the final 18 games of the 1987–88 season, after George Karl departed. Gregory served as "Basketball GM and Scouting" instructor for the online sports career training school, Sports Management Worldwide in Portland, Oregon.

References

External links
 BasketballReference.com: Ed Gregory

1931 births
2022 deaths
Fresno State Bulldogs men's basketball coaches
Golden State Warriors head coaches
National Basketball Association executives
Pepperdine Waves men's basketball players
UNLV Runnin' Rebels basketball coaches
American men's basketball players